Amy Winslow may refer to:

Amy Winslow, character in The Surrogate (1995 film)
Amy Winslow, character in 1994 Baker Street: Sherlock Holmes Returns